Mirzaganj Union is a union parishad of Mirzaganj Upazila of Patuakhali District, in Barisal Division, Bangladesh.

Demography 
According to the 2011 Census of India, the total population of Mirzaganj Union is 22,985.  Of these, 11,115 are males and 11,870 are females.  Total families 5,211.

Education 
According to the 2011 census, Mirzaganj Union has an average literacy rate of 58.4%.

References

Unions of Patuakhali District
Unions of Mirzaganj Upazila